Carlo Pallavicino (died 1497) was a Roman Catholic prelate who served as Bishop of Lodi (1456–1497).

On 21 June 1456, Carlo Pallavicino was appointed during the papacy of Pope Alexander VI as Bishop of Lodi.
He served as Bishop of Lodi until his death in 1497.

References

External links and additional sources
 (for Chronology of Bishops) 
 (for Chronology of Bishops) 

15th-century Italian Roman Catholic bishops
Bishops appointed by Pope Alexander VI
15th-century births
Year of birth uncertain
1497 deaths